The Symphony No. 3 in C minor is a symphony for orchestra composed by Florence Price in 1938. The work was commissioned by the Works Progress Administration's Federal Music Project during the height of the Great Depression. It was first performed at the Detroit Institute of Arts on November 6, 1940, by the Detroit Civic Orchestra under the conductor Valter Poole.  The composition is Price's third symphony, following her Symphony in E minor—the first symphony by a black woman to be performed by a major American orchestra—and her lost Symphony No. 2.

Composition
The symphony has a duration of roughly 30 minutes and is composed in four movements:
Andante
Andante ma non troppo
Juba: Allegro
Scherzo: Finale

Price started writing the symphony in the summer of 1938, but later revised the work prior to its 1940 premiere. It is notably different from her first symphony in that it uses less African-American themes; its beginning is almost Wagnerian. Some passages resemble Russian composers like Shostakovich.

Instrumentation

The work is scored for an orchestra comprising piccolo, three flutes, two oboes, English horn, two clarinets, bass clarinet, two bassoons, four horns, three trumpets, three trombones, tuba, harp, timpani, percussion, celeste, and strings.

Reception
Contemporary reception for the symphony was positive.  Reviewing the 1940 world premiere, J. D. Callaghan of the Detroit Free Press wrote:

Symphonic Reflections
The piece is sometimes performed in an abbreviated form, suggested by Thomas Wilkins, called Symphonic Reflections. In this format, the first movement is omitted and the remaining three re-ordered (Juba: Allegro, Andante ma non troppo, Scherzo: Finale) to form a fast-slow-fast pattern.

See also
Symphony No. 1 (Price)
Symphony No. 4 (Price)

References

3

1940 compositions
Compositions in C minor